Carenum planipenne is a species of ground beetle in the subfamily Scaritinae, found in Australia. It was described by William John Macleay in 1873.

References

planipenne
Beetles described in 1873